Glyphodes pulverulentalis is a moth of the family Crambidae. It was first described by George Hampson in 1896.

Distribution
It is known from China, Papua New Guinea, Australia, India and Thailand.

Biology
The larvae feed on the leaves of mulberries (Morus sp.).

References

Moths of Papua New Guinea
Moths of Asia
Glyphodes
Moths described in 1896